Andrew George Duff (22 May 1890 – 27 March 1981) was an Australian rules footballer who played for the Collingwood Football Club in the Victorian Football League (VFL).

Notes

External links 
		
Andy Duff's profile at Collingwood Forever

1890 births
1981 deaths
Australian rules footballers from Victoria (Australia)
Collingwood Football Club players